Masrena (meaning: Our Egypt) is a political action group in Egypt. 

It was founded by (names written as found in their Facebook accounts): Khaled Mansour, Moataz A. Fattah, Shady Sherif, Wael Khalil, Mohammad Omar, Ziad Aly, Wael Ghonim, Mohamed Diab, Baraa Ashraf.

See also
 Masrena Website
 Masrena Official Facebook Page

References

Political advocacy groups in Egypt
Egyptian revolution of 2011